Government of Canada Building may refer to:

Government of Canada Building, Scarborough, Ontario
Government of Canada Building, Moncton, New Brunswick
Government of Canada Buildings (North York), Ontario